Protestantische Rompilger (Protestant Rome Pilgrims) (subtitled:  Der Verrat an Luther, or The treason of Luther) was a polemic written by Alfred Rosenberg to answer the Protestant criticism (mainly from the Confessing Church) of his 1930 The Myth of the Twentieth Century.  It was also aimed against Friedrich Rittelmeyer and the Christengemeinschaft (Christian Community).  In it, he demanded that the German Volk be released from Christianity and called Christian teachings of sin and grace as "teachings of inferiority".  It was published by the Hoheneichen-Verlag, Munich, in a gift edition (already on its 4th edition by 1932, 696 S.), Volksausgabe (from 1933, 712 S.), Dünndrucksaugabe (712 S), and in an 86-page 1937 edition.

Reactions

Protestant churches
The work released a storm of indignation from the Deutschen Evangelischen Kirche (German Evangelical Church), Evangelisch-Lutherischen Kirche (Evangelical-Lutheran Church), Bruderrat der Evangelischen Kirche (Council of Brethren of the Evangelical Church), Schlesische Bekenntnissynode (Silesian Confessional Synod), Martin-Luther-Bund (Martin Luther League) and other connected organisations.  96 church leaders signed the Die Erklärung der 96 evangelischen Kirchenführer gegen Alfred Rosenberg against it in 1937. Walter Kunneth was a prominent Lutheran involved in the polemical controversy against Rosenberg.

Roman Catholic church
Bishop Alois Hudal, rector of the foundation of Santa Maria dell'Anima and an expert of the Holy Office, played a large part in getting "Myth of the 20th Century" placed on the Index of Forbidden Books on 7 February 1934 as a result of Protestantische Rompilger.

Nazism

Replies
 Ein Wort zu Alfred Rosenbergs Protestantische Rompilger: Rompilger oder Protestanten? Ulrich Nielsen, 1937
 Flugblatt des protestantischen Dekans, Kornacker, 1937
 Evangelische Wahrheit! Ein Wort zu Alfred Rosenbergs Schrift, Walter Künneth 
 Antwort auf den Mythus, Walter Künneth, 1935
 Wider die Verfälschung des Protestantismus, Walter Künneth
 Evangelische Wahrheit! Ein Wort zu Alfred Rosenbergs Schrift "Protestantische Rompilger", Walter Künneth, 1937
 Verrat an Luther? Erwiderung auf Alfred Rosenbergs "Protestantische Rompilger", Siegfried Scharfe

Bibliography
 Ökumenisches Jahrbuch 1936-1937, Friedrich Siegmund-Schultze, Hrsg., 434 S., Max Niehans Verlag, Zürich 
 Ein Wort zu Alfred Rosenbergs Protestantische Rompilger : Rompilger oder Protestanten?, Ulrich Nielsen, Basel, Schriften Verlag, o.J. (nach 1937). 1. Auflage, 12 S., OBroschur, Evangelische Schriften Heft 8, Eine Entgegnung zu Rosenbergs Schrift von aufrichtigen Christen 
 Protestantische Rompilger, Flugblatt des protestantischen Dekans Kornacker, Kornacker, 1937, Kempten
 Antwort auf den Mythus, Walter Künneth, 1935, 215 S., Wichern-Verlag, Berlin
 Evangelische Wahrheit! Ein Wort zu Alfred Rosenbergs Schrift "Protestantische Rompilger", Walter Künneth, 1937, 30 S., Wichern-Verlag, Berlin
 Wider die Verfälschung des Protestantismus, Walter Künneth
 Hitlers Pädagogen - Theorie und Praxis nationalsozialistischer Erziehung, Teil II: Pädagogische Felder, Hermann Giesecke, 2. Überarb. Aufl., Juventa-Verlag 1999, Weinheim

1930s books
Nazi works
Anti-Protestantism
Anti-Christian sentiment in Europe